The Headmasters' Conference of the Independent Schools of Australia (HCISA) was founded in 1931 and amalgamated in 1985 with the Association of Independent Headmistresses to form the Association of Heads of Independent Schools of Australia. It is the peak body representing the independent schools of Australia. It was modeled on the English Conference and was founded by four of the most influential Headmasters in Australia's history (Sir Francis Rolland CMG OBE , Sir James Darling , Leonard Robson CBE MC  and the Rev Julian Bickersteth MC . A history of the Conference outlining its activities and influence was written by James Wilson Hogg MBE. The Journal of the Conference is held by the National Library of Australia.

Chairman of Conference
 William Littlejohn of Scotch College, Melbourne
 Richard Penrose Franklin of Melbourne Grammar School
 Francis Rolland of Geelong College
 Leonard Robson of Sydney Church of England Grammar School
 Fred Ward of Prince Alfred College
 James Ralph Darling of Geelong Grammar School
 Colin Gilray of Scotch College, Melbourne
 Denys Hake of The King's School, Sydney
 Brian Hone of Melbourne Grammar School
 Colin Gordon of St Peter's College, Adelaide
 James Wilson Hogg of Trinity Grammar School (New South Wales)
 Colin Healey of Scotch College, Melbourne
 Henry Roberts of Anglican Church Grammar School
 John Dunning of Prince Alfred College
 Peter Thwaites of Geelong College
 Basil Travers of Sydney Church of England Grammar School
 Peter Moyes of Christ Church Grammar School
 Paul McKeown of Canberra Grammar School
 Gerard Cramer of Carey Baptist Grammar School
 Mark Bishop of Cranbrook School Sydney
 Tony Rae of Newington College
 Max Howell of Brisbane Grammar School

References

Australian schools associations